A health food store (or health food shop) is a type of grocery store that primarily sells health foods, organic foods, local produce, and often nutritional supplements. Health food stores typically offer a wider or more specialized selection of foods than conventional grocery stores for their customers, for example people with special dietary needs, such as people who are allergic to the gluten in wheat or some other substance, and for people who observe vegetarian, vegan, raw food, organic, or other alternative diets.

Health food

The term health food has been used since the 1920s to refer to specific foods claimed to be especially beneficial to health, although the term has no official definition. Some terms that are associated with health food are macrobiotics, natural foods, organic foods and whole foods. Macrobiotics is a diet focusing primarily on whole cereals. Whole cereals, along with other whole foods, are foods that are minimally processed. Whole cereals have their fiber, germ and hull intact and are considered more nutritious. Natural foods are simply foods that contain no artificial ingredients. Organic foods are foods that are grown without the use of conventional and artificial pesticides and must meet certain organic standards.

Nutritional supplements 
Most health food stores also sell dietary supplements, like vitamins, herbal supplements and homeopathic remedies. Herbal supplements have never been regulated until the European Directive on Traditional Herbal Medicinal Products came into force on 30 April 2004. The Traditional Herbal Medicinal Products Directive, 2004/24/EC, was established to provide a regulatory approval process for herbal medicines in the European Union (EU).

History

Many foods which are now commonplace in groceries first entered the market in the late 19th and early 20th centuries. Efforts by early health pioneers such as F.A. Sawall, Paul Bragg, Sylvester Graham, John Harvey Kellogg, George Ohsawa, Ellen White and others spurred an interest in health food.</ref> As early as the 1920s and 1930s health food stores started selling products.

Frank A. Sawall, began selling powdered mineral drinks door to door and lecturing around the United States on the benefits of vitamin and mineral supplements, before opening Sawall Health Food Products, Inc., in 1936. It began with powdered minerals and vitamins and also sold natural and organic foods. Frank A. Sawall, a biochemist, was described as "America's Outstanding Health Teacher and Nationally known Nutritionist" in newspapers across the United States. Sawall Health Foods is the oldest family-owned health foods store in the United States, with its fifth generation of Sawall's working in the business that is located in Kalamazoo, Michigan. Health food stores in the United States became common in the 1960s.

One early health food store was founded by Thomas Martindale in 1869 as "Thomas Martindale Company" in Oil City, Pennsylvania. In 1875 Thomas Martindale moved the store to Philadelphia.

See also

 Bulk foods, a feature of some health food stores
 Health promotion, political aspects in lifestyle changes
 Lifestyle medicine, preventive healthcare based on lifestyle changes
 Organic food, food produced by methods complying with the standards of organic farming
 Reformhaus, a health food store (German-speaking Europe)
 Specialty food, food made from high-quality ingredients

References

External links 

 

Health food stores
Food retailers
Organic food retail organizations
Supermarkets
Retailers by type of merchandise sold